Adrian Mihai Gîdea (born 13 March 2000) is a Romanian professional footballer who plays as a central midfielder for Liga II side Politehnica Timișoara, on loan from CFR Cluj.

Club career
Gîdea made his debut for CFR Cluj on 22 December 2020, in a 0–0 Liga I draw with U Craiova. He registered his first Liga I goal on 25 May, in a 2–0 home win with FCSB.

Career statistics

Club

Honours
CFR Cluj
Liga I: 2020–21, 2021–22
Supercupa României: 2020

References

2000 births
Living people
People from Drobeta-Turnu Severin
Romanian footballers
Association football midfielders
Liga I players
CFR Cluj players
Liga II players
SSU Politehnica Timișoara players